The first season of the American ABC fantasy-drama series Once Upon a Time premiered on October 23, 2011, and concluded on May 13, 2012. The series was created by Edward Kitsis and Adam Horowitz. The series' first season centers around the Enchanted Forest and Storybrooke, and the Evil Queen's (Lana Parrilla) plot to destroy everyone's happiness so she can be the only one with a happy ending.

Once Upon a Times first season received generally favorable reviews from critics who praised its cast, visuals, and twists on fairy tales, though some criticized its uneven tone.
The pilot episode was watched by 12.93 million viewers and achieved an adult 18-49 rating/share of 4.0/10. Those numbers dipped late in the season to a series low of 8.36 million viewers and a 2.8/8 adult 18-49 rating/share in April 2012, but rebounded slightly for the season finale with 9.66 
million viewers and a 3.3/10 adult 18-49 rating/share.

Premise
All of the classic fairy tales and other stories exist together in the same continuity, though many of the events played out slightly different to how the stories are told in our world. The structure of the show cuts back and forth between the events happening in the real world and the corresponding events that happened in the fairy tale world. 

On the night of her 28th birthday, bail bonds collector Emma Swan (Jennifer Morrison) is reunited with Henry Mills (Jared S. Gilmore)—the son she gave up for adoption ten years previous—who takes her back to his hometown of Storybrooke, Maine. 

Henry possesses a large book of fairy tales, suspecting that Emma is the daughter of Snow White (Ginnifer Goodwin) and Prince Charming (Josh Dallas), who sent her away so she would be protected from a powerful curse enacted by the Evil Queen (Lana Parrilla), a curse in which the queen is the only one with a happy ending. Because of the curse, everyone in Storybrooke is frozen in time with no memories of their former selves—except for the Queen, who is Storybrooke's mayor and Henry's adoptive mother, Regina Mills. Emma of course considers this theory to be completely outlandish and returns Henry home, but she still decides to remain in the New England town after becoming attached to him. This action causes the hands of the clock tower to move for the first time in 28 years. Henry also tells Emma that they are the only people who can leave Storybrooke, as others who try will suffer accidents.

In the fairy tale world, it is revealed that Snow and Charming, concerned for the safety of their unborn child, went to seek advice from the imprisoned trickster Rumplestiltskin (Robert Carlyle). In exchange for the child's name, he told them their only hope was the child, who would return on her 28th birthday and begin "The Final Battle." The child, an infant girl, is born on the day the Queen enacts her curse and is placed in a wardrobe carved out of an enchanted tree which takes the child to our world, where she grew up in the foster system, rebelled in her teen years, and ended up having Henry at 18.

In Storybrooke, Emma is soon elected as Sheriff following the sudden death of the previous Sheriff, Graham Humbert (Jamie Dornan), believed by Henry to be the Huntsman. Regina's antagonistic attitude raises Emma's suspicions and prompts her to move in with Henry's teacher Mary Margaret Blanchard, believed by Henry to be her mother, Snow White. Regina's bitter rivalry with Storybrooke's wealthiest resident, Mr. Gold, becomes heated when she learns he is still aware of his true identity as Rumplestiltskin. Mary Margaret falls in love with David Nolan, a coma patient who is really Prince Charming. David wakes up after she reads Henry's fairytale book to him as a favor to Henry. David, however, is married to Kathryn Nolan, the woman who is (in the fairy tale world) his ex-fiancée Princess Abigail, daughter of King Midas. Unable to deny their love, David and Mary Margaret soon begin a secret relationship that becomes public and upsets Kathryn.

Kathryn eventually decides to go to Boston and let David be with Mary Margaret only to disappear before leaving Storybrooke. Sometime later, an antique jewelry box that belonged to Mary Margaret when she was a child is found buried near the old toll bridge and is revealed to contain a human heart, which is proven to be Kathryn's via DNA testing. Mary Margaret is arrested for Kathryn's supposed murder and hires Mr. Gold as her attorney. As Mary Margaret is about to be prosecuted by corrupt District Attorney Albert Spencer (Alan Dale), Kathryn is found alive in an alley. It is revealed that Regina and Mr. Gold plotted to frame Mary Margaret and force her out of Storybrooke, but Mr. Gold double-crossed Regina and let Kathryn go to exonerate Mary Margaret. When Daily Mirror chief editor Sidney Glass (Giancarlo Esposito), previously the Magic Mirror, confesses to having abducted Kathryn to jump-start his career, Emma is not convinced. She concludes that Regina orchestrated the conspiracy and forced Sidney to "confess."

Emma soon discovers that writer August W. Booth (Eion Bailey), who is the first stranger ever to arrive in town after she did, is from the Enchanted Forest as well: he is Pinocchio, who was sent to our world through the same wardrobe that brought Emma to watch over her. He abandoned her out of fear and is slowly turning back into a wooden puppet as a result. Emma then attempts to take Henry out of Storybrooke forever but is then forced to reconsider when he refuses to go. She finally makes a deal with Regina, in which she agrees to leave but will still get to visit Henry on occasion.

Since Regina knows Emma's true identity, however, she retrieves her poisoned apple (the same one she used on Snow White) to use on Emma in the form of an apple turnover. Henry, desperate to prove to Emma that the curse is real, takes a bite of the turnover and collapses to the floor unconscious. Emma, who now starts to believe after seeing flashbacks of her true past, is forced to ally with Regina to save Henry and retrieve Rumplestiltskin's true love potion from Maleficent, imprisoned as a dragon underneath the Clock Tower. After slaying the dragon, Emma heads back to save Henry, but Mr. Gold intervenes and steals the potion, leaving Emma halfway up the elevator shaft and Regina tied to a chair and gagged.

When Henry is pronounced dead, Emma and Regina return to the hospital to say goodbye to his body. Emma kisses him on the forehead, causing a pulse of energy to engulf the entire town and restore everyone's true memories while freeing Henry from the effects of the poisoned apple. Snow and Charming reunite with each other, and Regina returns to her mansion alone as Emma begins to wonder why no one is returning to the Other World since the curse is broken. Rumplestiltskin reunites with his true love Belle (Emilie de Ravin) and takes her to a Wishing Well deep in the heart of the forest, a well with the power to restore that which one had lost. He takes the potion and drops it into the well, causing a purple cloud to emerge and consume Storybrooke as the clock strikes 8:15.

Cast and characters

Main
Ginnifer Goodwin as Snow White / Mary Margaret Blanchard
Jennifer Morrison as Emma Swan
Lana Parrilla as Evil Queen / Regina Mills
Josh Dallas as Prince Charming / David Nolan
Jared S. Gilmore as Henry Mills
Raphael Sbarge as Jiminy Cricket / Dr. Archie Hopper
Jamie Dornan as Huntsman / Sheriff Graham Humbert
Robert Carlyle as Rumplestiltskin / Mr. Gold
Eion Bailey as Pinocchio / August Wayne Booth

Recurring
Beverley Elliott as Widow Lucas / Granny
Meghan Ory as Red Riding Hood / Ruby
Lee Arenberg as Dreamy / Grumpy / Leroy
Gabe Khouth as Sneezy / Tom Clark
David Paul Grove as Doc
Faustino Di Bauda as Sleepy / Walter
Mig Macario as Bashful
Michael Coleman as Happy
Giancarlo Esposito as Genie / Magic Mirror / Sidney Glass
Jeffrey Kasier as Dopey
Anastasia Griffith as Princess Abigail / Kathryn Nolan
Keegan Connor Tracy as Blue Fairy / Mother Superior
David Anders as Dr. Whale
Alan Dale as King George / Albert Spencer
Tony Perez as Henry
Tony Amendola as Mister Geppetto / Marco
Emilie de Ravin as Belle
Sebastian Stan as The Hatter / Jefferson

Guest
Jakob Davies as Young Pinocchio / August Booth
Kristin Bauer van Straten as Maleficent
Jessy Schram as Cinderella / Ashley Boyd
Tim Phillipps as Prince Thomas / Sean Hermann
Dylan Schmidt as Baelfire
Richard Schiff as King Leopold
Barbara Hershey as Cora / Queen of Hearts 
Ingrid Torrance as Nurse Ratched
Harry Groener as Martin
Carolyn Hennesy as Myrna
Gabrielle Rose as Ruth
Alex Zahara as King Midas
Brad Dourif as Zoso
Karley Scott Collins as Gretel / Ava Zimmer
Quinn Lord as Hansel / Nicholas Zimmer
Emma Caulfield as the Blind Witch
Geoff Gustafson as Stealthy
Eric Keenleyside as Sir Maurice / Moe French
Amy Acker as Nova / Sister Astrid
Jesse Hutch as Peter
Noah Bean as Daniel Colter
Bailee Madison as Young Snow White
Sage Brocklebank as Gaston
Ted Whittall as the King
Catherine Lough Haggquist as the Fairy Godmother

Crew
Once Upon a Time is created and produced by Edward Kitsis and Adam Horowitz. In addition, Jane Espenson, Steve Pearlman, Kathy Gilroy, Damon Lindelof, and Brian Wankum are also producers. Liz Tigelaar also serve as series executive producers. Paul Kurta, Chad Oakes, Michael Frislev are producers, while Jordan Feiner and Keri Young are associate producers. Writers for season one episodes include: Kitsis, Horowitz, Espenson, Liz Tigelaar, David H. Goodman, Andrew Chambliss, and Ian Goldberg, with Daniel T. Thomsen writing an episode teleplay.

Episodes

Reception

Critical response
Rotten Tomatoes gave the season an approval rating of 80% based on 35 reviews, with an average rating of 6.06/10. The site's critical consensus reads, "Charming and fantastical, Once Upon a Time is tonally uneven but derives strength from an outstanding cast and handsome visuals."

Metacritic gave it a score of 66 out of 100 based on 26 critics, indicating "generally favorable reviews". Washington Posts Hank Stuever called the series "a smartly-crafted reward for fans of light fantasy, with the right mix of cleverness, action and romance." Verne Gay of Newsday said the series "glows with a near-theatrical shine, challenging viewers to think about TV drama as something other than boilerplate."
Several feminist outlets were pleased with the show for its feminist twist on fairy tales. Avital Norman Nathman of ##### stated that she liked the show for "infusing a feminist sensibility" into the stories. Feministings Genie Leslie commented that Emma was a "badass", that she liked how Emma was "very adamant that women be able to make their own decisions about their lives and their children", and how Emma was a "well-rounded" character who was "feminine, but not 'girly'". Natalie Wilson from Ms. praised the show for a strong, "kick-butt" female lead, for including multiple strong women who take turns doing the saving with the men, for subverting the fetishization of true love, and for dealing with the idea of what makes a mother in a more nuanced fashion. Wilson went on to state about the lead: "Her pursuit of a 'happy ending' is not about finding a man or going to a ball all gussied up, but about detective work, about building a relationship with her son Henry, and about seeking the 'truth' as to why time stands still in the corrupt Storybrooke world.

Ratings

Soundtrack

Extended play

Album

The album was released featuring five different collectible covers.

Novelization
Once Upon a Time debuted a fantasy novel from Disney-owned Hyperion books. The novel, titled Reawakened, covers the first season and promises to give "fans of the show a whole new look at their favorite characters and stories." The narrative is told from the points-of-view of Emma Swan in Storybrooke and Snow White in the Enchanted Forest. Written by Odette Beane, the novel was published on April 27, 2013 as an exclusive ebook and May 7, 2013 in paperback form.

Home video releases

Notes

References

External links

Season 1)
2011 American television seasons
2012 American television seasons